The 2021–22 Botola 2, also known as Botola Pro 2 Inwi for sponsorship reasons, is the 60th season of Botola 2, the second division of the Moroccan football league. The season began on 4 December 2020 and is scheduled to end by the summer of 2021.

Teams

League table

Results

Positions by round
The table lists the positions of teams after each week of matches.

See also
 2021–22 Botola
 2021–22 Moroccan Amateur National Championship

External links
 Soccerway

References

Botola seasons